Juliana of Hesse-Darmstadt (14 April 1606 in Darmstadt – 15 January 1659 in Osterode am Harz) was the wife of Count Ulrich II of East Frisia and was regent for her minor son Enno Louis from 1648 to 1651.  Her parents were Landgrave Louis V of Hesse-Darmstadt and Magdalene of Brandenburg, daughter of Elector John George von Brandenburg.

Juliana arrived in East Frisia on 5 March 1631 and married count Ulrich II on the same day.  She and her husband had three sons:  Enno Louis, George Christian and Edzard Ferdinand.  Even during the turmoil of the Thirty Years' War Ulrich managed to build a Lustschloss for his wife at Sandhorst.  It was completed in 1648 even though East Frisia had to endure great hardship during the war, due to various foreign occupiers.

After her husband's death, she was appointed guardian of her minor sons, and regent of the county.  However, she sent her cumbersome sons abroad and lived a life of decadence, leaving the management of the badly damaged county in the hands of her favourites, who managed the county poorly.  This led to increasing problems with the East Frisian Estates.

Most notable among these favourites were Secret Councillor Johann von Marenholz and his wife Elisabeth von Ungnad zu Sonneck, who a been a lady-in-waiting for Juliana.  Juliana was alleged to have had an affair with Marenholz, which later proved his undoing.  He was executed in Wittmund on 21 July 1651, after a show trial.  In the meantime, Juliana had moved the court from Aurich to Sandhorst to be able to indulge in the sweet life undisturbedly.  Many East Frisians held that under Marenholz and his wife, the problems of the county had gotten out of hand and urged the young Count Enno Louis to return to his County.

Emperor Ferdinand III declared Enno Louis to be an adult in 1651 and in May that year Enno Louis removed his mother from government.  She was sent to her Wittum at Berum Castle.  In 1654 she bought the farm Westerhof in Osterode am Harz, where she died on 15 January 1659.

Ancestors

References and sources 
 Tielke, Martin (ed.): Biographisches Lexikon für Ostfriesland, Ostfriesisches Landschaftliche Verlag- u. Vertriebsgeschäft, Aurich, vol. 1  (1993), vol. 2  (1997), vol. 3  (2001)
 Franz Kurowski: Das Volk am Meer – Die dramatische Geschichte der Friesen, Türmer-Verlag 1984, .
 Mathilde Raven: Elisabeth von Ungnad – Biographischer Roman aus der Geschichte Oldenburg – Ostfrieslands  Lohse-Eissing Verlag, .

 

  

1606 births
1659 deaths
Nobility from Darmstadt
Landgravines of Hesse-Darmstadt
East Frisia
Regents of East Frisia
German people of the Thirty Years' War
House of Hesse
House of Cirksena
17th-century women rulers
Daughters of monarchs